Lambert Smith Groenewald (born 1 February 1989 in Worcester) is a South African-born Zimbabwean rugby union player who most recently played for the . His regular position is flanker.

Career

Youth

He represented them at Under-19 and Under-21 level between 2008 and 2010.

Sharks

A further five appearances followed in the 2010 Vodacom Cup, as well as eight appearances in the 2011 competition.

Brescia and Ordizia

Golden Lions

Pumas

He was a member of the Pumas side that won the Vodacom Cup for the first time in 2015, beating  24–7 in the final. Groenewald made eight appearances during the season, scoring two tries.

In July 2015, the Pumas announced that they signed Groenewald on a permanent basis for the 2016 season.

Zimbabwe

In May 2014, the ZRU confirmed that Groenewald would be available to play for the Zimbabwe during the 2014 Africa Cup, a competition that doubled up as the African qualifying competition for the 2015 Rugby World Cup.

References

South African rugby union players
Zimbabwean rugby union players
Living people
1989 births
Golden Lions players
Sharks (Currie Cup) players
Sharks (rugby union) players
Rugby union players from Worcester, South Africa
Rugby union flankers